Walter Kennedy Pearce (2 April 1893 – 31 July 1960) was an English first-class cricketer. Pearce was a right-handed batsman and a solicitor. He was born in 1893 Bassett, Southampton to Arthur William Pearce (1858–1928) and his wife Frederica Emma, née Maund (1853–1932).

Pearce made his first-class debut for Hampshire against the Gloucestershire in the 1923 County Championship. Pearce played five matches for Hampshire in 1923.

Pearce returned to the club for the 1926 County Championship, playing four matches for the club. Pearce's final first-class match came against Somerset. In his nine first-class matches Pearce scored 127 runs at an average of 18.14, with his highest score of 63 coming in the 1923 County Championship against Glamorgan.

Pearce died in Romsey, Hampshire on 31 July 1960.

References

External links
Walter Pearce at Cricinfo
Walter Pearce at CricketArchive

1893 births
1960 deaths
Cricketers from Southampton
English cricketers
Hampshire cricketers
English solicitors
20th-century English lawyers